The , abbreviated to  , is a Japanese national university in Nishihara, Okinawa Prefecture, Japan. Established in 1950, it is the westernmost national university of Japan and the largest public university in Okinawa Prefecture. Located in the Senbaru neighborhood of the town of Nishihara, its campus borders both the village of Nakagusuku and the city of Ginowan.

History
Under the auspices of the United States Civil Administration of the Ryukyu Islands, the University of the Ryukyus was founded as a territorial university on the site of the historic Shuri Castle in Naha on May 22, 1950. It was established under the guidance of Michigan State University. It was placed under the jurisdiction of the Government of the Ryukyu Islands in 1966.

Ryūdai became a Japanese national university on May 15, 1972, upon Okinawa's return to Japan. The university moved to its current campus between 1975 and 1984. The relocation allowed for the restoration of the castle. The university was a state-run university from 1972 until 2004, when it was reclassified as a National University Corporation after the Japanese government made changes to the national university system.

Relationships
Ryūdai has developed its own traditions of contributing to and advancing the position of the local community, of conducting international exchange, and of broadening the knowledge base of the people of Okinawa through academic and educational activities. Since 1988, Ryūdai and the University of Hawaii have had a "sister university" relationship, and have opened up centers for Okinawan studies at both universities. In January 2013, the University of the Ryukyus began a research exchange program with South Korea's Mokpo National University. The University of the Philippines Diliman had noted interest on Ryūdai since 2007 due to its research on underwater cultural landscapes.

Faculties and graduate schools

Faculties 
Law and Letters 
Education 
Science 
Medicine 
Engineering 
Agriculture

Graduate schools 
Humanities and Social Sciences 
Education 
Medicine 
Health Sciences 
Engineering and Science 
Agriculture 
Law school

Inter-department institutes 
Center of Molecular Biosciences 
Center for Cooperative Research  
Instrumental Research Center 
Education and Research Center for Lifelong Learning 
Computing and Networking Center

Facilities for education and research 
Center for Educational Research and Development 
The Institute for Animal Experiments 
Manufacturing Laboratory 
Subtropical Field Science Center 
Educational and Clinical Center for Children with Disabilities  
Research Laboratory Center 
Joint-Use Inter-Department Institutes 
Low Temperature Center 
University Evaluation Center 
Radioisotope Laboratory 
University Education Center 
Center for Asia-Pacific Island Studies 
Language Center 
Environmental Science Center

International Programs
Sister-School Programs
Partner Universities...71 
Departmental Exchange Agreements...43

Student Exchanges with Partner Universities
Inbound...79
Outbound...33

Research Exchange
Outbound researchers...595
Inbound researchers...203

International Students
Undergraduates...53
Graduate...135
Auditing...23
Research...10
Special Auditing...71
Special Research...4

The Fujukan Museum 
The  is the university's main museum. Its collection includes biological specimens from around the Ryukyus, artifacts from Shuri Castle, traditional farming tools, local crafts, folk toys, and geological samples. Some of the objects are catalogued digitally in an online database. It does not charge admission fees.

The University Museum is a successor of the Museum of Agriculture – likewise called Fujukan – founded in 1967 on the former (Shuri) campus.

Athletics

American Football 

Ryukyus has an American football team that competes in the Kyūshū Collegiate American Football Association.

References

External links
University of the Ryukyus Japanese language Website
English language Website
 

Japanese national universities
Educational institutions established in 1950
Okinawa under United States occupation
University of the Ryukyus
1950 establishments in Japan